Hippeastrum papilio is a flowering perennial herbaceous bulbous plant, in the family Amaryllidaceae, native to southern Brasil.

Description
Colours are variable from white to creamy-green, or dark apple-green with carmine, maroon or purple striations.

Taxonomy 
Collected in the 1960s, it was originally described by Pierfelice Ravenna in 1970 as a species of Amaryllis, it was transferred to Hippeastrum by Johan Van Scheepen in 1997. Placed in the epiphytic Omphalissa subgenus.

Etymology 
papilio: Latin Butterfly

Distribution
Tropical rain forests of the Atlantic coast of southern Brazil. While its natural habitat is shrinking, it is becoming increasingly popular in horticulture

Ecology 
Epiphytic.

Conservation 
Considered endangered.

References

Sources 
 
 GBIF: Hippeastrum papilio
 Pacific Bulb Society: Hippeastrum papilio (image)
 
 Zuloaga, F. O., O. Morrone, M. J. Belgrano, C. Marticorena & E. Marchesi. (eds.) 2008. Catálogo de las Plantas Vasculares del Cono Sur (Argentina, Sur de Brasil, Chile, Paraguay y Uruguay). Monogr. Syst. Bot. Missouri Bot. Gard. 107. 2008 
 International Bulb Society: Hippeastrum papilio (image)
 Forzza, R. C. et al. 2010 onwards. Lista de espécies Flora do Brasil

Flora of South America
papilio
Garden plants of South America
Plants described in 1970